The A131 road is a road in Essex, England. 

It runs from the A130 road (near Little Waltham) to the A134 road at Sudbury. The A131 road by-passes Great Leighs, Young's End, Great Notley, then goes through the A120 road as the Braintree by-pass. It then meets the B1053 road (at the north end of the Braintree by-pass), goes through High Garrett, where it meets the A1017 road (coming off to the left) and Halstead (where it crosses the A1124 road).

Sources 
 Google Maps

Roads in England